The 2012 Korea National League Championship, known as Woori Bank 2012 National League Championship, is the ninth competition of the Korea National League Championship. R League team Korean Police was invited to the competition.

Group stage

Group A

Group B

Group C

Group D

Knockout stage

Bracket

Quarter-finals

Semi-finals

Final

See also
2012 in South Korean football
2012 Korea National League

References

External links

Korea National League Championship seasons
K